Alejandro Elias López is a member of the provincial legislature in Neuquén Province in Argentina, elected in June 2011.

He is the first person elected from the Workers' Left Front.

He was a ceramist worker, and general secretary of the ceramists' trade union.

He stood down in December 2012, to be replaced by Raúl Godoy.

External links 
his official blog (Spanish)
Socialist Core article

Argentine trade union leaders
Living people
People from Neuquén Province
Year of birth missing (living people)